A popular movement is a type of group action also called a social movement.

People's Movement or Popular Movement may also refer to a number of political parties:

 Algerian Popular Movement (founded 2013)
 People's Movement for the Liberation of Angola (MPLA, founded 1956)
 Barbuda People's Movement, Antigua and Barbuda (founded 1989)
 Argentina:
 Catamarca Popular Movement (founded 1971)
 Fueguian People's Movement (founded 1985)
 Neuquén People's Movement (founded 1961)
 People's Electoral Movement (Aruba) (MEP, founded 1971)
 People's Progressive Movement (Barbados) (1956-1966)
 Cameroon People's Democratic Movement (CPDM, French: , RDPC, renamed 1985)
 People's Progressive Movement (Cayman Islands) (founded 2002)
 People's Movement against the EU, Denmark (founded 1972)
 People's Movement for Justice and Welfare, Denmark (founded 2006)
 Democratic People's Movement, Ecuador (MPD, founded 1978

 Patriotic People's Movement (Finland) (IKL, 1932-1944)
 France:
 Popular Republican Movement (MRP, 1944-1967)
 Union for a Popular Movement (UMP, 2002-2015)
 People's Labour Movement, Grenada

 Popular Movement in Iraq ( / , founded 2011)
 Popular Movement (Italy) (1975-1994)
 People's Movement (Ireland)
 People's Movement of Kosovo (LPK, 1982-2013)
 People's Movement of Kyrgyzstan (2004-2005)
 People's Movement (Lebanon) ( / , founded 2000)
 People's Progressive Movement (Malawi)
 Malaysian People's Movement Party, Malaysia (founded 1968)
 Popular Movement (Morocco) (Arabic:  / , French: , founded 1957)
 two multi-party movements in Nepal:
 People's Movement I (1990) ( / )
 2006 democracy movement in Nepal, also known as People's Movement II or Jana Andolan II
 People's Movement (New Zealand) (1930s-1940s)
 People's Democratic Movement, Papua New Guinea (founded 1985)
 People's Movement Party, Romania (MP, founded 2013)
 Trinidad and Tobago:
 People's National Movement (founded 1955)
 Tobago Council of the People's National Movement (founded 1998)
 People's Popular Movement (1986)
 People's Movement (Tunisia), founded 2011
 People's Movement of Ukraine ( / , founded 1990)
 Popular Movement (Uzbekistan), or Unity (founded 1989)

See also
People's Party (disambiguation)